Mahmud Ahmad Hamdi al-Falaki (1815-19 July 1885) was an Egyptian engineer, mathematician and scientist. He was born in al-Hissa, Gharbia Governorate.

He was Egypt's representative at the Third International Geographical Congress and Exhibition, Venice, Italy, 1881. Mahmud Ahmad Hamdi al-Falaki also excavated and surveyed Alexandria in 1866 for producing a plan of the ancient town. His plan was later dismissed in  the English speaking world as unreliable (while continental archeologists and historians used it). Recent discoveries confirmed that the plan made by Mahmud Ahmad Hamdi al-Falaki is reliable.

References

Bibliography
Crozet, Pascal. 'La trajectoire d’un scientifique égyptien au xixe siècle: Mahmûd al-Falakî (1815-1885)' In: Entre réforme sociale et mouvement national: Identité et modernisation en Égypte (1882-1962) [online]. Le Caire: CEDEJ - Égypte/Soudan, 1995 (generated 29 juin 2020). Available on the Internet. . DOI: https://doi.org/10.4000/books.cedej.1420.
Stolz, Daniel A, The Lighthouse and the Observatory - Islam, Science, and Empire in Late Ottoman Egypt, Cambridge University Press. Online publication date: December 2017, Print publication year: 2018. Online

External links
Carte de l'antique Alexandrie et de ses faubourgs. Author:  Falakī, Maḥmūd Aḥmad Ḥamdī al- (1815-1885).

Egyptian astronomers
Egyptian scientists
Cartographers from the Ottoman Empire
Egyptian cartographers
Irrigation Ministers of Egypt
Education Ministers of Egypt